Vighnaharta Ganesh was  a Hindi television series based on Hindu scriptures revolving around Ganesha. It started airing on Sony Entertainment Television in India on 22 August 2017, and is one of the longest running ancient Hindu TV series in India.

Cast

Main
Akanksha Puri as Parvati, Sati, Jagdamba, Bhadrakali, Ardhanarishvara, Katyayani, Kamakshi, Mahamaya, Matangi, Mahakali, Kaushiki, Tara, Tripura Sundari, Bhuvaneshvari, Bhairavi, Chhinnamasta, Dhumavati, Bagalamukhi, Kamala, Yogamaya, Kalaratri, Chandmaari, Chamunda, Maheshvari (2017–2020)
Madirakshi Mundle replaced Akanksha as Parvati
 Malkhan Singh as Mahadev, Virabhadra, Jalandhara, KaalBhairav, Aghori, Matanga, Mahakala, Akshobhya, PanchVakra, Ardhanarishvara, Trayambak, Bhairava, Kaband, MahaRudra
Uzair Basar as Ganesha and Vinayak
Nishkarsh Dixit replaced Uzair Basar as Ganesha
 Basant Bhatt as Kartikeya
 Kunwar Pratham replaced Basant Bhatt as Kartikeya
 Rahul Sharma as Vishnu, Krishna
 Kuldeep Singh replaced Rahul Sharma as Vishnu
 Hitanshu Jinsi replaced Kuldeep Singh as Vishnu 
 Anshu Malik as Devi Lakshmi and Devi Alakshmi, Devi Vaishnavi
 Deblina Chatterjee replaced Anshu Malik as Devi Lakshmi
 Riney Aryaa replaced Deblina Chatterjee as Devi Lakshmi and Devi Sita
 Digvijay Purohit as Brahma
 Preetika Chauhan as Devi Saraswati and Devi Brahmani
 Bhawna Kanwar Hada replaced Preetika Chauhan as Devi Saraswati
 Sunidhi Chauhan as Devi Devasena and Devi Amritavalli
 Pali John as Devi Valli and Devi Sundaravalli
 Ashutosh Tiwari as Nandi
 Ketaki Kulkarni as Devi Riddhi
 Saachi Priya as Devi Siddhi
 Zeel Thakkar as Devi Ashokasundari
 Phalguni Sharma replaced Zeel Thakkar as Devi Ashokasundari
 Urmimala Sinha Roy as Devi Jyothi
 Chandralekha Mukherjee	Devi Jyothi
 Ishita Ganguly as Devi Manasa
 Amit Maru as Totla gan
 Mak Mukesh Tripathi as Bhringi
 Bhuta, Preta, Pramatha, Guhyaka, Dakini, Pisaca, Kushmanda, Vetala, Vinayaka and Brahmarakshasa
 Tushar Dalvi as Parvatraj Himavan
 Akanksha as Devi Menavati
 Sakshi Prajapati as Bela
 Payal Gupta as Rani Sarala
 Harish Patel as Maharshi Agastya
 Nazea Hasan Sayed as Devi Lopamudra / River Kaveri
 Jay Dave as Markandeya
 Harshit Kabra replaced Jay Dave as	Rishi Markandeya
 Akanksha Juneja as Jogan Kantha
 Harsh Vashisht as Chandradhar
 Prashant Singh Rajput as Lakhinder
 Priya Arora as Roopmati
 Arun Mandola as Lakshmana
  Tina Datta /Aishana Singh as Devi Radha
 Ankur Nayyar as Parshurama , Gorakhnath 
 Sanjeev Pandey as Jamadagni
 Gagan Malik as Sudama and Shankachuda
 Heena Parmar as Devi Tulsi
 Nadeem Ahmad Khan as Teekshana
 Manisha Rawat as Devi Vaishno Devi
 Anupama Solanki as Devi Mohini
 Rajeev Bhardwaj as Raja Mordhwaj and Vyapari Sadhu
 Praveen Tiwari as Balarama
 Prapti Shukla as Devi Subhadra
 Meghan Jadhav as Bhakt Madhavdas
 Tarun Khanna as Tulsidas
 Anand Goradia as Narada
 Hemant Choudhary as Daksha
 Shikhar Gulani as Rishi Kashyapa

Recurring 
 Meer Ali as Indra
 Lala Tiger as Agni
 Viren Singh as Surya
 Suraj Sonik replaced Viren Singh as Surya
 Anshul Bammi / Sonu Dagar / Multiple as Chandra
 Vikas Salgotra as Vayu
 Rohit Chaudhary replaced Vikas Salgotra as Vayu
 Tushar Chawla as Varuna
 Aaditya Bajpayee replaced Tushar Chawla as Varuna
 Devendra Mishra as Shani
 Devi Neelima
 Triyugg Mantri as Yama
 Devi Dhumorna or Devi Priya
 Athar Siddiqui as Devantak
 Bharat Bhatia as Kuber Dev
 Kaivalya Chheda replaced Bharat Bhatia as Kuber Dev
 Suchit Vikram Singh as Kamadeva
 Javed Pathaan as Veerabaahu
 Haelyn Shastri as Devi Priya
 Manoj Malhotra as Vishwakarma
 Aishwarya Raj Bhakuni as Devi Sanjna/Chhaya
 Riyanka Chanda as Devi Rohini
 Sonia Sharma as Devi Sachi
 Sarika Raghwa as Devi Bhudevi
 Manav Sharma as Durgamasura
 Nirbhay Wadhwa as Mahishasura and Hanuman
 Deepak Wadhwa as Raktabija
 Ram Awana as Ekaksha
 Amit Behl as Tarakaksha
 Meet Mukhi as Subodh
 Aman Dhaliwal as Bhandasura
 Gaurika Sharma as Rashmi Prabha
 Ketan Karande as Shumbha
 Gajendra Chauhan as Dambhasura
 Vinit Kakar as Gajmukhasur and Andhakasura
 Simar Khera as Sanghargupt
 Rajesh Khera as Kraunch / Mushikasura
 Sonia Singh as Devi Vrinda
 Paras Chhabra as Ravana
 Chirag Jani as Sindura and Surapadma
 Rahul Ranaa as Gajasura and Tarakasura

See also
Devon Ke Dev...Mahadev
Om Namah Shivay (1997 TV series)
Mahakali-Anth Hi Aarambh Hai

External links
 
 Vighnaharta Ganesh on Sony Liv
 Vighnaharta Ganesh on Sony TV

2017 Indian television series debuts
Indian television series about Hindu deities
Sony Entertainment Television original programming